S3X may refer to:

 Sex in the Internet slang Leetspeak
 Chevrolet S3X
 Tesla Motors, naming scheme (Model S, Model 3, Model X), after Ford blocked the Model E trademark registration

See also
 Sex (disambiguation)
 Sussex, abbreviated as "SSSX" (three-S X)